Ernest Wilson (24 June 1907 – 3 March 1981) was an English cricketer. He played 81 first-class matches for Surrey County Cricket Club between 1928 and 1936.

See also
 List of Surrey County Cricket Club players

References

External links
 

1907 births
1981 deaths
English cricketers
Surrey cricketers
People from Godstone
Sportspeople from Surrey